Kisimngiuqtuq Peak is a mountain in Qikiqtaaluk, Nunavut, Canada. It is associated with the Baffin Mountains on Baffin Island. It is the tenth highest peak in Nunavut and the eleventh highest peak in Nunavut by topographic prominence.

References

External links
 "Kisimngiuqtuq Peak, Nunavut" on Peakbagger

Arctic Cordillera
Mountains of Baffin Island
One-thousanders of Nunavut